Sir Christopher Barker (died 4 January 1550) was an officer of arms at the College of Arms in the City of London who rose to the highest position of Garter Principal King of Arms.

Early years
Christopher was the son of William Barker of Stokesley in the North Riding of Yorkshire (now North Yorkshire) and his wife, Joan, the daughter of William Carhill and sister of Sir Christopher Carhill, Norrey King of Arms. In adulthood, he lived in Newbury in Berkshire.

Heraldic career
Barker started his heraldic career as the private officer of arms of Charles Brandon. Barker was made Lisle pursuivant in 1513 and Suffolk Herald in 1517. He is known to have accompanied his employer on journeys to France in 1514 and 1515. On 1 November 1522 Barker was made a royal officer of arms as Richmond herald. In June 1536 he was promoted to Norroy King of Arms, and was quickly promoted to Garter Principal King of Arms on 15 July.

As Garter King of Arms, Barker helped to organize ceremonies such as the christening of Prince Edward in 1537, the funeral of Queen Jane Seymour in the same year, the proclamation of Henry VIII as King of Ireland in 1541, and the funeral of Henry and the coronation of Edward in 1547. When Henry invaded France in person in 1544 Barker had a prominent place in front of the King's banner. Shortly before Henry's death Barker's evidence was crucial when Henry Howard, Earl of Surrey, was condemned to death for including the arms of Edward the Confessor among the many quarters in his own coat of arms.

Personal life
Barker married three times. His first wife was Margaret was the widow of John Longe and previously of John Garret. His second wife, Ellen was the widow of Henry Rigby and daughter of Richard Dalton of Croston, Lancashire. With Ellen, Barker had two sons who predeceased him. One of these sons, Justinian, died in Spain in 1543 as Rouge Croix Pursuivant. Barton's nephew, Laurence Dalton, also joined the College of Arms and became Norroy King of Arms. Barker's third wife was Edith, widow of Robert Legge.

In 1521 he joined the Vintners' Company. He was master of the company from 1540 to 1543. Barker was recorded as lying sick at Christmas 1549 and he died at Paternoster Row in London on 4 January 1550 and was buried in St Faith's under St Paul's. His widow survived him by only about six months. Many of his heraldic collections and manuscripts compiled by him survive at the College of Arms.

Arms

See also
Heraldry
Officer of arms

External links
The College of Arms
Heraldic List of Officers of Arms

References
Citations

Bibliography
L. Campbell and Francis Steer. A Catalogue of Manuscripts in the College of Arms Collections. (London, 1988).
John Anstis. The Register of the Most Noble Order of the Garter. (London, 1724), 376–379.
Andrew Crawford. A History of the Vintners' Company. (London, 1977).
Dictionary of National Biography, Barker, Sir Christopher (d 1549), Garter king of arms, by Sidney Lee. Published 1885.
Walter H. Godfrey and Sir Anthony Wagner, The College of Arms, Queen Victoria Street: being the sixteenth and final monograph of the London Survey Committee. (London, 1963).
Sir Anthony Wagner. Heralds of England: a History of the Office and College of Arms. (London, 1967).
Sir Anthony Wagner. Heralds and Heraldry in the Middle Ages. (London, 1956).
Mark Noble. A History of the College of Arms. (London, 1805), 137–42.
Sir Anthony Wagner. A Catalogue of English Mediaeval Rolls of Arms. Harleian Society (London, 1950).

1550 deaths
English antiquarians
English genealogists
English officers of arms
Year of birth unknown
16th-century English writers
16th-century male writers
16th-century antiquarians
English knights
People from Hambleton District
People from Newbury, Berkshire
Garter Principal Kings of Arms